The 1990–91 Scottish Cup was the 106th staging of Scotland's most prestigious football knockout competition. The Cup was won by Motherwell who defeated Dundee United F.C. in the final.

First round

Replays

Second round

Replays

Third round

Replays

Fourth round

Replay

Quarter-finals

Replay

Semi-finals

Replay

Final

See also
1990–91 in Scottish football
1990–91 Scottish League Cup

Scottish Cup seasons
Scottish Cup, 1990-91
Scot